Milton Andrade Vaz Mendes (born 7 October 1979 in Amadora, Lisbon), known simply as Milton, is a Portuguese footballer who plays as a winger.

References

1979 births
Living people
People from Amadora
Portuguese footballers
Association football wingers
Liga Portugal 2 players
Segunda Divisão players
S.C. Praiense players
GS Loures players
F.C. Barreirense players
F.C. Lixa players
S.C. Freamunde players
Cypriot First Division players
Cypriot Second Division players
Doxa Katokopias FC players
AEK Larnaca FC players
Akritas Chlorakas players
PAEEK players
Othellos Athienou F.C. players
Portuguese expatriate footballers
Expatriate footballers in Cyprus
Expatriate footballers in France
Portuguese expatriate sportspeople in Cyprus
Sportspeople from Lisbon District